Brod is a settlement on the left bank of the Sava Bohinjka River in the Municipality of Bohinj in the Upper Carniola region of Slovenia.

Church

The local church is dedicated to Saint Mary Magdalene with preserved frescos dating to the 15th century as well as 16th-century frescoes painted by Jernej of Loka.

References

External links 

Brod at Geopedia

Populated places in the Municipality of Bohinj